Home Run King is a sports video game released in 2002 by WOW Entertainment. A sequel, Sega Home Run King 2, was released in 2004 for the mobile platform.

References

2002 video games
GameCube games
GameCube-only games
Lavastorm games
Major League Baseball video games
Mobile games
Multiplayer and single-player video games
North America-exclusive video games
Sega games
Video games developed in Japan
Video games developed in the United States